Rebecca "Becky" Jane (born 31 March 1992) is an English footballer who plays as a defender for Reading in the Women's Super League. She previously played for Chelsea, Reading, Liverpool and Charlton Athletic.

Playing career

Club
 
Jane played for Reading in the second-division FA WSL 2 during the 2015 FA WSL season. She played in the left-back position and scored two goals in 23 appearances. Jane helped the team win the league and signed a professional contract with the team ahead of the 2016 season in the FAWSL 1.

During the 2016 FA WSL regular season, Jane made 15 appearances for the club helping Reading finish in fourth place. She was named Supporters' Player of the Year. In January 2017, she signed an extended contract with the club until June 2019. During the 2017 FA WSL Spring Series, Jane played in 7 of the club's 8 matches. Reading finished in 6th place with a  record. During the 2017-18 FA WSL season, Jane played in six matches. The club finished in fourth place with a  record.

In June 2019, after more than 100 appearances for Reading, she signed for Liverpool.

On 25 May 2021 Jane left Liverpool after her contract expired.

In May 2022, Charlton Athletic announced that Jane would be one of eight players leaving the club when their contracts expired. On 3 August 2022, Jane returned to Reading, signing a one-year contract.

International
Jane has represented England on the under-17, under-19, and under-23 national teams. She scored a goal during the semi-finals of the 2008 FIFA U-17 Women's World Cup in New Zealand. Jane played for England at the 2010 UEFA Women's Under-19 Championship final.

Honors and awards
 with Reading
 FAWSL 2: 2015

References

External links
 Reading FC Women profile
 

Living people
1992 births
English women's footballers
Women's association football defenders
Women's Super League players
Chelsea F.C. Women players
Reading F.C. Women players
England women's under-23 international footballers
Liverpool F.C. Women players
Charlton Athletic W.F.C. players
Women's Championship (England) players